Khaled Abdelaziz Sulaiman al-Karaki (born 1946) is a Jordanian author, poet, academic and politician. He served as the Jordanian Minister of Culture (1989–91) and Deputy Prime Minister (1995–96 and 2010–11). He is a past president of Jerash University (2002–2006) and the University of Jordan (2007–2010). He currently chairs the Jordan Academy of Arabic.

Personal life
He was born in 1946 in Al-Adnanya village in Al-Karak, south of Jordan. He was previously married to the writer Insaf Qala'aji.

Education
He took his bachelor's degree in Arabic language from University of Jordan in 1969 and master's degree in Arabic language and literature from the same university in 1977. He received his PhD in philosophy from the Oriental Studies department of the University of Cambridge, Cambridge, UK, in 1980.

Political career
Al-Karaki was a member of the advisory committee of the Ministry of Culture (1988). He then served as Minister of Culture (December 1989 - January 1991), Minister of Culture and Youth (January 1991 - June 1991), Minister of Culture and Information (June 1991 - October 1991) and Minister of Culture and Higher Education (October 1991 - November 1991). He was subsequently Deputy Prime Minister and Minister of Information (January 1995 - February 1996) and later Deputy Prime Minister and Minister of Education (July 2010 - January 2011). He was a Fellow of the Jordanian Senate (October 2011 – 2013).

During the 1990s, he served as political advisor to Hussein bin Talal, the King of the Hashemite Kingdom Of Jordan.  He twice served as chair of The Royal Hashemite Court (1992–1993 and March–October 2011).

Academic and literary career
Al-Karaki was a professor of Arabic at the University of Petra (1997–2000). He was the president of Jerash University (2002–2006). He served as president of the University of Jordan (May 2007 to July 2010), where he has also served as a Fellow of the Faculty Of Arts, Editor of the deanship of scientific research journal, Assistant dean of Faculty Of Arts For Administrative And Financial Affairs, Chief editor of cultural journal, and Dean of the deanship of students' affairs. 

He is a Fellow of the Jordan Academy of Arabic, and has served as its Vice chair and Chair. He was a Fellow of the permanent office of the Arab association for comparative literature (Algeria 1984), the royal strategic studies center-Al Al-bet institute (from 2000), and the Jordanian Writers Society.

He has served as head of the Jordanian Writers Society (1985-1990), Chairman of Jordanian Press Foundation (Al-Rai newspaper; 2000-2002), and deputy chair of the board of trustees of the Al-Albeit Foundation for Islamic Thought (from 2000).

Awards

He received the King Hussein Medal of Excellence-First class.

References

External links
 

1946 births
Living people
Jordanian writers
Academic staff of Petra University
People from Al Karak
Alumni of the University of Cambridge
University of Jordan alumni
Academic staff of the University of Jordan
Culture ministers of Jordan
Heads of universities in Jordan
Academic staff of Jerash University